Bryan Goldberg (born ) is an American entrepreneur and the owner of  Bustle Digital Group, which operates a number of media properties, including Bustle, Nylon, W Magazine and Gawker. Previously, Goldberg founded Bleacher Report, a sports news website that sold to Turner Broadcasting System in 2012 for $200 million. Bryan Goldberg is widely considered to be a polarizing figure in New York media. He has been described as the “buyer of last resort” for his hard-nosed deal making tactics and a “media mogul” by The New Yorker.

Early life 

Goldberg grew up in Los Altos, California. His father was a technology executive who worked at Atari and Quantum and his mother was a homemaker. He earned his undergraduate degree from Middlebury College, where he studied economics and Japanese. He briefly worked as an investment banker at Credit Suisse, and later worked as an analyst at Deloitte Consulting.

Career 

Goldberg founded Bleacher Report in 2007 with David Finocchio, Alexander Freund, and David Nemetz, who were friends from middle school. Though not an engineer by training, Goldberg took on most of the technical tasks related to the sports news website. Bleacher Report quickly became a competitor to traditional sports news media such as ESPN and Sports Illustrated and was known for drawing huge audiences with its high volume of content and slideshows. The company also launched the Team Stream app and ultimately surpassed ESPN as the largest sports network for mobile and social media. The site was acquired for $200 million by Turner Broadcasting System in 2012. After the sale, Goldberg and his cofounders took all 160 employees on a trip to Las Vegas.

Goldberg left Bleacher Report in 2013 to found Bustle, a women’s interest website. In preparation, he interviewed hundreds of women about what they thought was missing from traditional publications like Glamour and Cosmopolitan. While the launch was met with critical response, Bustle has grown to 31.2 million readers, nearly half being women under 34.

In April 2017, Goldberg and his company acquired Elite Daily, a millennial-focused site, from the Daily Mail and rebranded as Bustle Digital Group.

In March 2018, Goldberg purchased The Zoe Report from celebrity style icon Rachel Zoe, who subsequently became a partner in his Bustle Digital Group venture.

In July 2018, Goldberg purchased the rights to Gawker at a bankruptcy auction. The popular site had previously been forced into closure after being sued by professional wrestler Hulk Hogan. Gawker’s auction was the subject of great media attention, and Goldberg’s initial refusal to state his plans for the site made him the subject of intense speculation. He subsequently announced plans to relaunch Gawker in early 2019, but later paused the project.

In November 2018, Goldberg purchased Mic.com for a reported price of under $10 million—a sharp discount from the nearly $100 million that the company had been worth only a year prior. Goldberg cited his desire to expand Bustle Digital Group further into News and Politics, a move that was criticized by the Mic Union after widespread corporate layoffs.

In July 2019, Goldberg acquired Nylon, an alternative fashion and music publication with a focus in experiential marketing. Though the magazine had previously exited print, Goldberg promised to resume publishing the magazine.

In August 2020, Goldberg pushed further into fashion by partnering with celebrities Karlie Kloss, Kaia Gerber, and Lewis Hamilton to acquire W Magazine. The luxury fashion magazine had previously been part of Conde Nast.

To date, the company has raised $80 million in venture capital funding and has been valued at just over $200 million.

Napoleon’s Hat 

Bryan Goldberg purchased the iconic hat owned and worn by Emperor Napoleon Bonaparte at a Sotheby’s auction in November, 2021 for a price of $1,400,000. He told The New York Post that “I can’t believe the price I got” on the historical object given the rarity and condition. Previously, the hat had belonged to Scottish nobles descended from Sir Michael Shaw-Stewart, who purchased the hat in 1814 and was acquainted with Bonaparte’s family.

Goldberg stated that he intends to lend the hat to a museum, but also plans to wear it at formal occasions and possibly at his wedding.

References 

1983 births
American media executives
21st-century American businesspeople
Living people
Middlebury College alumni
People from Los Altos, California
American mass media company founders